Julia Faure (born 13 February 1977) is French actress. She has appeared in films such as Camille Rewinds, Wild Innocence and Love Me If You Dare.  She has also appeared in the television shows Au nom de la vérité and I Love You 2.

Selected filmography
 Wild Innocence (2001)
 Process (2004)
 Pause (2014)
 Tout de suite maintenant (2016)
 All That Divides Us (2017)
 Coma (2022)

References

External links

French film actresses
21st-century French actresses
Living people
1977 births
Most Promising Actress Lumières Award winners